FC Dynamo Omsk was a Russian football team from Omsk. It played professionally from 1993 to 2001. Their best result was 7th place in Zone 7 of the Russian Second Division in 1993.

External links
  Team history at KLISF

Association football clubs established in 1993
Association football clubs disestablished in 2001
Defunct football clubs in Russia
Sport in Omsk
1993 establishments in Russia
2001 disestablishments in Russia